Alf Flinth (2 January 1897 – 5 August 1982) was a Norwegian footballer. He played in six matches for the Norway national football team from 1924 to 1927.  He played for the Kvik Halden FK soccer team.

References

External links
 

1897 births
1982 deaths
Norwegian footballers
Norway international footballers
People from Halden
Association football midfielders
Kvik Halden FK players